Noor ul-Haq is an Arabic phrase formed from the elements Noor, al- and Haqq, meaning light of truth. It may refer to:

People
Nurul Huq (Captain) (born 1922), Bangladesh Navy officer
Sheikh Md. Nurul Haque (born 1940),  Bangladesh Awami League Member of Parliament
Nur ul-Haq Ulumi (born 1941), Afghan politician
Nurul Haq Nur (born 1991), Bangladeshi student activist
Noor-ul-Haq (cricketer) (born 1992), Afghan cricketer
Nurul Huq Bhuiyan, Bangladesh politician

See also
Noor-ul-Haq (book), written by Mirza Ghulam Ahmad, the founder of the Ahmadiyya Movement in 1894

Arabic masculine given names